Servilia, also known as Servilia Minor or Servilia the Younger was the second wife of Lucullus.

Biography

Early life
There is some debate as to who her father was. Older authors who follow Plutarch deem her to be the daughter of Quintus Servilius Caepio and Livia, thus the younger full sister of Servilia Major and Gnaeus Servilius Caepio and half-sister to Cato the Younger and Porcia. Some modern historians such as Susan Treggiari tend to believe that she was actually the daughter of Gnaeus Servilius Caepio, thus a niece of Cato; but this is not universally accepted, Judith P. Hallett has argued that is implausible that the younger Caepio (who was born in 98 BC) would have married so young and sired a daughter fast enough that she would be old enough to marry Lucullus in 66 BC.

Marriage
The historian Edward Courtney identified her as the Servilia who was married to Quintus Lutatius Catulus, but that woman was more likely her aunt Servilia.

Lucullus married her on his return from the Third Mithridatic War around 66 BC, after divorcing his first wife Claudia. Servilia bore him a son whose name is uncertain. She was unfaithful to her husband with his enemy Gaius Memmius. Lucullus, after putting up with her conduct for some time out of regard to Cato the Younger at length divorced her. On the outbreak of the civil war in 49 BC, she accompanied Cato, with her child, to Sicily, and thence to the Roman province Asia. Cato left her behind in Rhodes, while he went to join Pompey.

Family

Cultural depictions
In Colleen McCullough's Masters of Rome series Servilia is called "Servililla" or just "Lilla" and is depicted as having been married to her cousin Drusus before marrying Lucullus, it is stated that Drusus divorced her for infidelity.

See also
 Servilia gens
 Women in ancient Rome

References

Citations

Bibliography
 Plutarch, "The Life of Lucullus", 38; "The Life of Cato the Younger", 24, 54.
 Wilhelm Drumann, Geschichte Roms, vol. iv, p. 174.

Servilii Caepiones
1st-century BC Roman women
1st-century BC Romans
Family of Servilia (mother of Brutus)